The United States Army conducted many campaigns during World War II. These are the campaigns that were officially designated by the Army. It is the basis of campaign honors and awards for U.S. Army units and servicemen, but is not a comprehensive list of all the campaigns of the war, as it omits campaigns in which U.S. Army participation was minimal.

In all, 44 World War II campaigns were designated by the U.S. Army: 24 for the Asiatic–Pacific Theater, 19 in the European–African–Middle Eastern Theater, and one in the American Theater. In addition, there were three main blanket campaigns: antisubmarine warfare, ground combat and air combat. These were designated for each theater, except the American Theater, which only had the one blanket campaign awarded – anti-submarine warfare. These three theaters each had its own campaign ribbon. The list of campaigns includes those undertaken by U.S. Army units participating in ground combat as well as those undertaken by United States Army Air Forces participating in air combat.

Overview 

The war started for America on 7 December 1941 with the Japanese attack on Pearl Harbor, and the invasion of the Philippines and the Dutch East Indies. Hard-fought campaigns in Papua and Guadalcanal followed in 1942. In 1943, the Japanese were driven from the Aleutian Islands, and U.S. forces landed in the northern Solomon Islands, the Gilbert Islands, and the Bismarck Archipelago. This was followed in 1944 by the invasion of the Marshall Islands, a series of landings in western New Guinea, the capture of the Mariana Islands and Battle of Palau. The U.S. Army returned to the Philippines in October 1944, waging major campaigns on Luzon and the southern Philippines through 1945. U.S. forces landed on Okinawa and in April 1945. Atomic bombs developed under the direction of the U.S. Army were dropped on Hiroshima and Nagasaki in 1945, which caused the Japanese to unconditionally surrender on 2 September 1945, aboard the USS Missouri.

While U.S. support for China was a reason for the war, the U.S. Army did not deploy major ground forces there, although U.S. air and service units played a vital role. After being driven out of Burma in 1942, a provisional regiment of the U.S. Army (Merrill's Marauders) participated in the reconquest of Northern Burma in 1944, and two regiments took part in the Central Burma Campaign the following year before moving on into China. In response to U.S. Army Air Forces operations from China, the Japanese drove the Americans and Chinese from eastern China. Only in the last weeks of the war did the tide turn in favor of the Allies in China.

Although many campaigns were fought in Asia and the Pacific, the major focus of the U.S. Army was always on the European Theater, where most its strength was ultimately deployed. U.S. forces saw action in the invasion of North Africa in November 1942, and the subsequent Tunisia Campaign in 1943. The U.S. Army participated in the Allied invasion of Sicily in July 1943, and then the Allied invasion of Italy in September. Hopes for a quick capture of Rome were frustrated by the Germans, who conducted a fighting withdrawal to the Gustav Line, which the landing at Anzio and the fighting at Monte Cassino in January 1944 failed to break. The Gustav Line was finally broken in May 1944, while Rome was captured on 4 June, and the Germans retreated to the Gothic Line in Northern Italy, where the Allies were held until they broke into the Po Valley in a successful offensive in April 1945.

In June 1944, the U.S. Army participated in Operation Overlord, the Allied invasion of Normandy. After heavy fighting, the Allies broke out of Normandy in July 1944. Efforts to capture the ports in Brittany proved difficult, but Allied forces quickly liberated Belgium and much of France. U.S. forces participated in the invasion of southern France (Operation Dragoon) in August 1944, and the airborne assault on the Netherlands (Operation Market Garden) in September, but logistical difficulties and German resistance slowed U.S. assaults on the Siegfried Line and in Lorraine in late 1944. In December 1944, the U.S. Army was surprised by the German Ardennes offensive (the Battle of the Bulge), which was defeated only after costly fighting that strained the U.S. Army's manpower to its limits. In February 1945, operations began that drove the Germans from the Rhineland, and the Rhine was crossed in March 1945. In April 1945, U.S. Army forces entered the heartland of Germany. Operations continued until the war in Europe ended on 8 May 1945 with the signing of unconditional surrender the previous day.

Asiatic–Pacific Theater

Pacific campaigns

Campaigns in the China India Burma Theater

Blanket campaigns

European–African–Middle East Theater

North African / Mediterranean Theater campaigns

European campaigns

Blanket campaigns

American Theater

Blanket Campaigns

Notes

Footnotes

References 
 
 
 
 
 
 
 
 
 
 
 
 
 

Army campaigns during World War II

World War II
Campaigns during World War II
Campaigns during World War II
Campaigns
Lists of military conflicts